The women's 80 metres hurdles at the 1954 European Athletics Championships was held in Bern, Switzerland, at Stadion Neufeld on 27 and 28 August 1954.

Medalists

Results

Final
28 August

Semi-finals
28 August

Semi-final 1

Semi-final 2

Heats
27 August

Heat 1

Heat 2

Heat 3

Heat 4

Heat 5

Heat 6

Participation
According to an unofficial count, 25 athletes from 14 countries participated in the event.

 (2)
 (1)
 (1)
 (3)
 (1)
 (1)
 (2)
 (1)
 (3)
 (1)
 (2)
 (3)
 (3)
 (1)

References

80 metres hurdles
Sprint hurdles at the European Athletics Championships
Euro